The ICC Americas Championship is the continental cricket championship for the Americas region, for Affiliate and Associate members of the International Cricket Council in North, Central and South America, and the Caribbean. This is the first year that the tournament is organized in three divisions.

The division three was played in Suriname. This tournament was won by the host and won one spot in division two (played in Argentina. Division two was won by the host. Argentina won one spot in division one. Division one was played in Canada, and was won by Bermuda.

Division One

Division One was held in Canada, commencing on 21 August. Five teams took part: Argentina, Bermuda, Canada (host and holder), the Cayman Islands and the United States. The venues were in the Maple Leaf Ground and the Toronto Cricket, Skating and Curling Club.

Points Table

Division two

Division Two was held in Argentina, commencing on 3 April. Five teams took part: Argentina (host), Bahamas, Belize, Panama, and Suriname. The venues were St Albans Club and Hurlingham Club in Buenos Aires. Argentina and Bahamas qualified for Wcl5.

Points Table

Division three

Division Three was held in Suriname, commencing on 15 February. Four teams took part: Brazil, Chile, Suriname (host), and Turks and Caicos. The venues were Snellen Park and Axwijk Sports Centre in Paramaribo.

Points Table

References

External links
 Cricket Archive
 ICC Cricket News

International cricket competitions in 2006
ICC Americas Championship
2006 in Caribbean sport